The Thief is the ninth studio album by American rock band Floater, released on May 18, 2018. The entire album was debuted live at the Wonder Ballroom on May 12.

Track listing
Light it Up
Like a Landslide
Bring Me More
Interlude
Last Forever
Morning You
The Terminal
Here Comes the Night
What If
Handcuffs
The Thief

References 

2018 albums
Floater (band) albums